The 12769 / 12770 Seven Hills Express is a Superfast Express train belonging to Indian Railways – South Central Railway zone that runs between Tirupati and  in India.

It operates as train number 12769 from Tirupati to Secunderabad Junction and as train number 12770 in the reverse direction serving the states of Andhra Pradesh & Telangana.

It is named after the famed Seven Hills temple of Tirumala Venkateswara Temple.

Coaches
The 12769 / 70 Tirupati–Secunderabad Seven Hills Express has 1 AC 2 tier, 2 AC 3 tier, 8 Sleeper Class, 6 General Unreserved & 2 SLR (Seating cum Luggage Rake) coaches. It does not carry a pantry car.

As is customary with most train services in India, coach composition may be amended at the discretion of Indian Railways depending on demand.

Service

As the average speed of the train is above , as per Indian Railways rules, its fare includes a Superfast surcharge.

Routing

Traction
As large sections of the route are yet to be fully electrified, a Gooty-based WDP-4D locomotive powers the train for its entire journey.

Rake sharing
The train shares its rake with 12761/12762 Tirupati–Karimnagar Superfast Express and 17007/17008 Secunderabad–Darbhanga Express.

Operation
12769 Tirupati–Secunderabad Seven Hills Express leaves Tirupati every Monday & Friday arriving Secunderabad Junction} the next day.

12770 Secunderabad–Tirupati Seven Hills Express leaves Secunderabad Junction every Tuesday & Friday arriving Tirupati the next day.

References

 *

External links

 Youtube.com
 Thehindu.com
 Scr.indianrailways.gov.in
 Dailymotion.com

Transport in Tirupati
Transport in Secunderabad
Named passenger trains of India
Rail transport in Andhra Pradesh
Rail transport in Telangana
Express trains in India